Franz Bauer (1798, Vienna - 14 March 1872, Vienna) was an Austrian sculptor in the late Classical style.

Life and work 
From 1814, he studied at the Academy of Fine Arts, Vienna, with Johann Nepomuk Schaller then, after 1815, worked in the studios of Josef Klieber. A travel grant enabled him to study in Rome, where he worked with Bertel Thorvaldsen. 

He returned to Vienna in 1842 and taught at the Academy. He was appointed a Professor at the preparatory school in 1852 and, from 1865, headed the general sculpture school.

His best known students included Carl Kundmann, Antonín Pavel Wagner, Johannes Benk, Rudolf Weyr and Viktor Oskar Tilgner.

Selected works 
 Pieta (marble), Kunsthistorisches Museum, 1841/1842
 St. Ferdinand, niche figure, Johann Nepomuk Church, 1844

Source 
 Biography by W. Krause @ the Österreichisches Biographisches Lexikon

1798 births
1872 deaths
Austrian sculptors
Academic staff of the Academy of Fine Arts Vienna
Artists from Vienna